Chandavaram Buddhist site is an ancient Indian Buddhist site in Chandavaram village in Prakasam district in the Indian state of Andhra Pradesh. The Chandavaram Buddhist site was built between the 2nd century BCE and the 2nd century CE during the Satavahana dynasty and was discovered by Veluri Venkata Krishna Sastry in 1964.

Much of the sculpture has been removed from the site, and the best collection is in the Telangana State Archaeology Museum, Hyderabad. Some of the best pieces from the site museum have been stolen in recent decades. It is in the Amaravati style.

History
The first of its kind in the state of Andhra Pradesh, the Chandavaram Buddhist site was constructed between the 2nd century BCE and the 2nd century CE. It was an active center for Buddhist religious activities, and was also inhabited at the time. The age of the site was determined by the carbon dating of artifacts discovered during excavation. The sculptural panels in the site are of the Amaravati school which also suggests that the site was built between the 2nd century BCE and the 2nd century CE. The Chandavaram Buddhist site was used as a resting place by Buddhist monks travelling from Kashi to Kanchi. Discovered in 1964, the site was constructed during the Satavahana dynasty. Ayaka pillars are absent from the site, indicating that the Hinayana form of Buddhism was prevalent in Chandavaram. The site houses a double terraced MahaStupa on a hilltop which is next in importance only to Sanchi Stupa. The hill on which the MahaStupa is located is called Singarakonda.

Construction and structure

Constructed during the Satavahana dynasty, the Chandavaram Buddhist site houses a double terraced main stupa built on an elevated platform situated on a hilltop. The MahaStupa exhibits the characteristics of stupas built under the Hinayana form of Buddhism. It has carved panels that portray the Dharmachakra (the wheel of Dharma, one of the Ashtamangala of Indian religions such as Hinduism, Jainism and Buddhism). Apart from the main stupa, the site also houses several viharas, Brahmi inscriptions and other stupas.

The MahaStupa resembles the Dharmarajika stupa in Taxila, Pakistan. The panels on the main stupa are made of limestone. The panels and the drum sections of the main stupa exhibit the Buddha footprint, stupas, Bodhi trees and also narratives in the form of Jataka tales along with other stories. Since 1964, the Chandavaram Buddhist site has been excavated four times, and fifteen regular-sized and approximately one hundred small stupas have been discovered. The site comprises the following:

Main Stupa (MahaStupa)
Maha Chaitya
Museum
Silamandapa
Vihara
Votive Stupas

Modern statue of Buddha
In 1985, a project called the "Buddha Poornima Project" was proposed. Under this project, the world's tallest standing monolith statue of Buddha was to be erected on the site. However, the Buddha statue was transported to city of Hyderabad in 1988 instead, where it was erected in 1992 in the Hussain sagar lake, where it stands today.

Archeological finds
One MahaStupa, fifteen regular-sized and approximately one hundred small Stupas have been discovered in the Chandavaram Buddhist site. Apart from the Maha Chaitya, Silamandapa, Vihara and the Votive Stupas, more than two dozen "Buddhist slabs" (decorated with designs and inscriptions) have also been discovered.

Thefts from museum
Robberies of artefacts has been reported at the Chandavaram Buddhist site since the year 2000. In March 2001, three more ornate pillars and a lotus medallion were stolen.

Geographic location

Gallery
All Telangana State Archaeology Museum

References 

Archaeological sites in Andhra Pradesh
Buddhist monasteries in India
Buddhist pilgrimage sites in India
Buddhist sites in Andhra Pradesh
Buildings and structures in Prakasam district
Colossal Buddha statues
Former populated places in India
Stupas in India
Buddhist buildings in India